Osman Achmatowicz (April 16, 1899 – December 4, 1988) was a Polish professor of chemistry of Lipka Tatar descent. His son, Osman Achmatowicz Jr., (also a chemist) is credited with the Achmatowicz reaction in 1971.

Biography
Professor Osman Achmatowicz was a Polish Tatar of Islamic confession.

The sixth of eight children in a noble family of an outstanding jurist Alexander Achmatowicz, he was born at the ancestral estate Bergaliszki, near Oszmania, on 16 March 1899.

Educated at the Royal Corps in St. Petersburg (named Petrograd in 1914,renamed Leningrad in 1924), he was admitted to higher studies at the Mining Institute of Petrograd in 1916, and after interruption of its functions caused by the Bolshevik uprising, went to the Ukrainian Industrial Region, where he found a temporary employment as an apprentice at the coal mine Golubowka in the Donetsk Basin.

In 1919, after his arrival in Poland, freshly restored to independence (by The Versailles Treaty), he continued his studies at the faculty of Natural Sciences of the resurrected Vilnius University, named after the Polish king, Stephen Batory, and graduated with a diploma of a master of chemistry in 1924.

His post graduate studies consisted of two consecutive parts:

Three years of pre-doctoral research work at the organic chemistry department of Vilnius University, under supervision of Professor Casimir Slawinski. His doctoral thesis was devoted to the terpenoid bicyclic hydrocarbon bornylen. He was then awarded the degree of chemistry in 1928.
Two years of advanced studies/scholarship from the National Culture Fund, Warsaw, Director St. Michalski at the Dyson Perrins Laboratory of the University of Oxford, where his supervisors were Professor William Henry Perkin FRS, and, after his untimely death in 1929, Professor Robert Robinson of the University of London, 1947 Nobel Prize Winner. At Oxford Osman Achmatowicz attained the degree of doctor of philosophy, on the grounds of his dissertation on studies on the structure of strychnine and brucine.

On Return to Vilno, Achmatowicz rejoined the teaching staff of the organic chemistry department of the university, where he continued his research on the structure of strychnos alkaloids. He devised a new method of degradation using hydrogenolysis of quaternary ammonium salts containing nitrogen in allyl position, in the presence of palladinized charcoal as catalyst. This method became crucial in studies on organic compounds and was subsequently modified by other research workers over rupture of carbon-oxygen bonds.

Achmatowicz’s discovery of catalytic hydrogenolysis was assessed by the board of faculty as an important contribution to the advancement of degradation methods in organic chemistry and for this work Achmatowicz received the title of docent in 1933.

In the following year, 1934, Achmatowicz was appointed professor extraordinaire to the chair of pharmaceutical and toxicological chemistry, belonging to the faculty of pharmacy of the University of Warsaw.

This appointment meant that Achmatowicz was allocated increased research funds and better research facilities, and in subsequent research he:

Extended the scope of his experiments on the constitution of strychnos alkaloids and within four years realised all three stages of Hofman degradation of dihydrosstrychnidine (co-authors: R. Robinson and, in part, Cz.Dybowski), dihydrobrucidine (co-authors: P. Lewi and R. Robinson), and dihydro vomicidine (co-worker: B. Racinski)
Confirmed the validity of catalytic hydrogenolysis for splitting nitrogen-carbon bonds in quaternary unsaturated ammonium salts of the brucine series (co-worker: B. Bochwic)
Established the influence of position of the ethylenic linkage on the reactivity of quaternary salts in catalytic hydrogenolysis. (co-worker K.Lindenfeld).

Achmatowicz carried out further work on the problems of strychnine chemistry in the 1960s with his son Selim, J. Skolik, M. Wiewiorowski and J. Szychowski. The paper resulting from this work was published in 1966 in the volume of Tetrahedron and dedicated to Sir Robert Robinson, founder of the journal.

After joining the faculty of pharmacy Achmatowicz developed further research-programs with potential significance for medical sciences, as well as for pharmacy. He embarked on phytochemical research on Polish flora, specifically on physiologically active organic components of wild growing plants used in Polish folk-medicine.

The following rare species were recommended by Professors J. Muszynski (pharmacognosy department, University of Wilno) and J. Modrakowski (department of experimental pharmacology, University of Warsaw):
a) Club-Mosses (Lycopodium clavatum, B.selago, L.annotinum)
b) Yellow water-lily (Nuphar luteum) and white water-lily (Nymphacea alba)

After two years Achmatowicz in conjunction with the Polish pharmaceutical industry and Spiess and Son (scientific director Dr St. Otolski, chairman F. Wieckowski) succeeded in isolating and characterising, a number of hitherto unknown alkaloids.

In September 1939 all research was halted by the outbreak of war and Achmatowicz’s laboratory and research files were destroyed in subsequent bombing.

During the German occupation, all universities in Poland were closed and disbanded but Achmatowicz undertook secret underground teaching for student groups in Warsaw and Czestochowa.

When the war finished Achmatowicz helped inaugurate the Technical University of Łódź. The first Rector, Professor B. Stefanowski, had suggested that it move from Warsaw to Łódź.

Specifically he organised the chemical faculty of the Technical University of Łódź, as well as his own research workshop under the chair of organic chemistry. This was made possible by a generous grant from the Royal Society, London, facilitated by Sir Robert Robinson, president of the society. Other substantial financial aid was graciously rendered by General Stanisław Kopański, chief of staff of the Polish Armed Forces, stationed in Great Britain at that time. By 1948 the chemical faculty had its own premises with relatively modern research facilities.

Cooperating with Polish chemical industry Achmatowicz undertook research:
To determine beneficial applications for hitherto unused, components of coaltar (2-vinyl-pyridine)
To explore convenient methods for preparation of new compounds for further examination of their chemotherapeutic activity.

He succeeded in plotting new synthetic routes to hitherto unknown sulphones (in conjunction with E. Maruszewska-Wieczorkowska and J. Michalski)

The work initiated by Achmatowicz, in 1938, on the structure and bases of club-mosses alkaloids was further developed by organic chemists in 1942 in Canada, and later still in Germany. Achmatowicz resumed his research on Lycopodium alkaloids, and on Nuphar alkaloids, in the 1950s, when his Łódź laboratory was sponsored by the National Culture Fund (director: Stanisław Leszczycki) and by the Polish Academy of Sciences.

However, only in the 1960s was it possible for his laboratory to apply chromatographic and spectroscopic investigations and achieve significant and ground-breaking results, as annotated below:
Using only Lycopodium annotinum and L. Selago 17 alkaloids were separated into pure state (co-worker Wl. Rodewald).
Out of Lycopodium clavatum Achmatowicz succeeded in separating and determining the structure of a new alkaloid named clavatine (co-worker H. Zajac)
Organic acids connected with alkaloids were characterised (co-worker F. Werner-Zamojska).
Formulas of annotoxine and annotin were amended (taxonomic dependences were taken into consideration) and the pharmacological activity of annotoxine and annotine was examined in conjunction with Professor P. Kubikowski, Dr J. Majerczyk and Dr J. Szymanska (all of the department of experimental pharmacology of the Medical Academy, Warsaw).

Particularly important and fruitful were the studies on alkaloids of Nuphar luteum. In 1960-1962 Achmatowicz (co-workers; Z. Bellen and J. Wrobel) succeeded in separating four new alkaloids containing sulphur from this plant.

Studies on the separation of these unusual bases were accompanied by studies on their structure (co-workers Mrs H. Banaszek and J. Wrobel). For the mass-spectroscopic examination involved the help of Dr G. Spiteller (Institute of Organic Chemistry, Vienna University) was enlisted. The new alkaloids were named: thiobinupharidine and neothiobinupharidine.

The discovery of a new class of sulphur containing alkaloids was considered one of the most important achievements in organic chemistry of 1962 (“Highlights from Current Literature,” Chemistry and Industry, March 30, 1963).

In addition to continuing his alkaloid studies research, Achmatowicz undertook studies in the field of organic synthesis and reaction mechanisms. Specifically, the study of carbonyl cyanide, a simple compound, synthesized for the first time in 1937 by outstanding Polish organic chemist, Professor R. Malachowski, who died in 1944 during the Warsaw Uprising.

The team of Achmatowicz presented 15 publications on the most characteristic reactions of this compound, carbonyl cyanide. The team established that in the case of alkenes, which have hydrogen atoms in allylic position, carbonyl cyanide reacts to “ene” synthesis. The highly unstable intermediate product splits a molecule of hydrogen cyanide, thus forming beta-gamma unsaturated ketonitriles. On the other hand, in the case of alkenes which do not contain any hydrogen atoms in the allylic position, a transformation with CO (CN) consists in addition of a carbonyl group to the ethylene system, thus forming a 1.3-epoxypropane system (co-worker M.Leplawy).

It was also found that carbonyl cyanide possessed dienophylic properties (co-worker A. Zamojski). In reaction of carbonyl cyanide with chain and alicyclic alcohols and phenols (co-worker M. Leplawy) leads in good yields to cyanoformates that have their application in the synthesis of peptides. Carbonyl cyanide also reacts violently with ketens, forming dicyanopropionic beta-lactones (co-worker M. Leplawy).

Studies on reactions of carbonyl cyanide by the team headed by Achmatowicz, became the stimulus to undertake research in the domain of diene synthesis with systems of analogous structure.

A published series of papers resulted from research on dienophiles dimethylmesoxalate, diethyl azodicarboxylate, and a number of dienes and diene reactions (co-authors: O. Achmatowicz, junior, J. Wrobel, A. Zamojski).

Monoene type test reactions were carried out from which it was deduced that diethyl azodicarboxylate may be numbered among active enopholes (co-workers: F. Werner-Zamojska, K. Belniak, A. Zwiersak, Cz. Borecki, J. Szychowski).

Additionally, Professor Achmatowicz assisted his associate, J. Michalski, to develop larger scale studies on the organic chemistry of phosphorus.

In the period 1945-1952 Achmatowicz was the rector of the Technical University of Łódź, whilst holding the chair of organic chemistry and continuing his research.

From 1952-1953 the research of the group directed by Achmatowicz was strengthened by incorporating the department of organic synthesis within the Polish Academy of Sciences.

In 1953 Achmatowicz was appointed the undersecretary of state in the Ministry of Higher Education. Shortly afterwards he organized a research team at the Warsaw University. This scientific work in Warsaw was a continuation of his researches that were carried on in Łódź. After relinquishing his position in the Ministry of Higher Education in 1960 Achmatowicz devoted himself entirely to scientific work.

In 1964 Achmatowicz left Warsaw and assumed the position of the director of the Polish Cultural Institute in London. After five years, during which he directed the institute with great success, he returned to Poland and in autumn 1969 he retired.

In retirement his leisure interests were: classical music and the history of 18th-20th centuries.
He was father to three children: a daughter, Emilia Kryczynska, author-translator; two sons, both organic chemist research workers: Osman, professor, director of the Chemical Institute at the Agriculture University (SGGW) in Warsaw; and Selim, head of a division of the Institute of Electronic materials Technology, in Warsaw.

He died on 16 April 1988 in Warsaw and was buried in the family grave at the Moslem Cemetery there.

Ambassadorial representations
Director of the Polish Cultural Institute, London (1964–1969)
Represented Polish chemistry at the celebrations of the centenary of the Chemical Society, London (1964)
UNESCO Paris General Assembly as a member of the Polish delegation and presided over the natural sciences section of the assembly (1954)
Overseas guest of the British Association for the Advancement of Science, Bristol (1955)
Headed the Polish Universities delegation to Great Britain organised by the British Council (1957): received in audience by the Queen-Mother, Chancellor of the University of London.
Sat on the cultural committee of the Polish-British Round Table Conference at Jablonna in 1962 and at Wilton Park in 1967.

Meritorious awards and positions
State Orders Minister of Higher Education: awarded individual State Prize of 1st degree (1964)
Medal of the 10th Anniversary of People's Poland; the order of millennium (1966) for “discovering new alkaloids and studying their structure”
Merited Culture Activist, Distinction (1969)
Officer Cross of the order of “Polonia Restituta” (1951)
Commander Cross of the order of “Polonia Restituta” (1954)
Order of the Banner of Labor, First Class (1969)
Doctor Honoris Causa of the Technical University of Łódź (1960)
Director of the Polish Cultural Institute in London (1964–1969)

Scientific memberships and positions
1945: Polish Academy of Letters and Sciences – corresponding member
1945: Warsaw Scientific Society – member
1945: Łódź Scientific Society – member
1952: Polish Academy of Sciences – corresponding member (full member from 1961)
1980: Polish Chemical Society – honorary member (served as deputy president 1937–1939)
Chemical Society, London – life member
American Chemical Society – member
Swiss Chemical Society – member
Scientific board of the chemical journal Tetrahedron - member
Scientific board of Index Chemicu (Philadelphia) - member
Main Council of Higher Education and Qualification Commission for Scientific Staff - member (1953–1958)
Counsellor to the Minister of Higher Education (1960–1962)

References

Polish chemists
Polish Muslims
Polish people of Lipka Tatar descent
1899 births
1988 deaths
People from Ashmyany District
People from Oshmyansky Uyezd
Academic staff of Łódź University of Technology
People from the Russian Empire of Lipka Tatar descent
Officers of the Order of Polonia Restituta